Ellery Albee Hibbard (July 31, 1826 – July 24, 1903) was an American politician, a lawyer, a judge, and a U.S. Representative from New Hampshire.

Early life
Born in St. Johnsbury, Caledonia County, Vermont, Hibbard pursued academic studies, then read law with Nathan B. Felton and Charles A. Morrison in Haverhill and Exeter, New Hampshire. He was admitted to the bar in 1849.

Career
Hibbard practiced in Plymouth, New Hampshire, until 1853, and then in Laconia, Belknap County, New Hampshire. He served as clerk of the New Hampshire House of Representatives, 1852–1854, as Moderator of Laconia in 1862 and 1863, and as a member of the New Hampshire House of Representatives in 1865 and 1866.

Elected as a Democrat to the Forty-second Congress, Hibbard served as United States Representative for the state of New Hampshire from (March 4, 1871 – March 3, 1873). He was an unsuccessful candidate for reelection in 1872 to the Forty-third Congress. He was appointed judge of the New Hampshire Supreme Court in March 1873 and served until 1874, when he resigned and continued the practice of law. He served as director of Laconia National Bank, as a member of the board of education of Laconia.

Death
Hibbard died in Laconia, on July 24, 1903 (age 76 years, 358 days). He is interred at Union Cemetery, Laconia, New Hampshire.

Family life
Son of Silas and Olive Albee, Hibbard married Mary Houston Bell on December 5, 1853, and they had four children, Charles Bell, Jennie Olive, Walter Silas, and Laura Bartlett. He was a cousin of Harry Hibbard.

References

External links

1826 births
1903 deaths
Justices of the New Hampshire Supreme Court
Democratic Party members of the New Hampshire House of Representatives
Democratic Party members of the United States House of Representatives from New Hampshire
19th-century American politicians
People from Caledonia County, Vermont
19th-century American judges